Eranina fuliginella is a species of beetle in the family Cerambycidae. It was described by Bates in 1885. It is known from Guatemala.

References

Eranina
Beetles described in 1885